The Advisory Council, also known as the Government Advisory Council, Political Advisory Council,or Political Advisory Board, was a preparatory body for the parliament established in 1910. It was part of the New Policies in the late Qing dynasty, of which the Qing court was moving toward the implementation of a constitution. In September 1907, the Guangxu Emperor promulgated a decree on the setting up of the Advisory Council, following by the provincial Consultative Bureaus in October. 

The Advisory Council was established on 6 November 1906, and formally opened on 10 October 1910, after the first parliamentary election in last October. The Council was dissolved on 12 February 1912 along with the end of the Qing dynasty, and was replaced by the Provisional Senate of the Republic of China.

History 
After the Boxer Protocol was signed in 1901, the Qing court returned to capital Peking, eager to reform the governance. In around August 1906, Guangxu Emperor declared the start of preparative constitutionalism after the study by the Constitutionalism Commission on foreign politics. Two months later, Yikuang, Prince Qing, recommended forming the Advisory Council to prepare for the parliament. On 6 November 1906, the Emperor issued edict to revamp the governmental institutions, including the establishment of Advisory Council.

On 20 September 1907, the Emperor appointed Pulun and Sun Jialun as joint Presidents of the Council, and to draft its charter. In August 1908, the electoral system of the Council and the Provincial Assemblies were approved and governors of provinces were asked to hold relevant elections within a year. Half of the Council members were elected by members of the Assemblies, while the other half were appointed by the imperial court.

The Council and the Commission further agreed jointly a nine-year plan for installing constitutionalism. Provincial Assemblies shall be formed in 1908, with elections of the Assemblies and the Council held a year later. The Council shall be convened and formally opened in 1910. Constitution of the state, Parliament Law, Parliamentary Election Law, and election of the bicameral members are expected in 1916. By then constitutional monarchy will replace absolute monarchy.

The elections of the Council and Provincial Assemblies held as laid down in the plan. The bicameral parliament, however, did not come into existence as Qing dynasty was overthrown after Emperor Puyi was forced to abdicate in 1912.

Session 
The Council convened for the first time on 3 October 1910, with the President declaring it as "the unprecedented grand ceremony" in the Chinese history. All 196 members of the Council were divided evenly in 6 divisions, followed by election of division head (股長) and director (理事).

The second meeting marked the state opening of the Council, attending by the regent and virtually all ministers of the court. Attendants first kowtowed to the throne. The regent then announced the edict and addressed the Council. The Council agreed the President and the Vice President to present a humble address to thank His Majesty on behalf of the members. The meeting subsequently ended.

A total of 42 meetings were held, 9 of which was after the extension of the Council's session. 

On 18 December, the Council presented humble address (palace memorial) to the court over forming cabinet as responsibilities of Grand Council were unclear, which the court denounced as "interference by councillors" and insisted the court shall decide on matters of such. On 30 December, the Council presented another address to urge ending the policy of Manchu hairstyle and clothing.

According to the records of proceedings, the Council wafs closed on 11 January 1911 without the attendance of the regent. The edict was announced and the President kowtowed to the throne, marking the end of the first session of the Council.

However, the Council continued deliberation. On 25 January 1911, part of the new criminal code was promulgated after adoption by the Council. Two days later, the standardised treasury regulation was adopted by the Council, along with the 1911 (Xuantong Year 2) budget on the next day. During the Railway Protection protest, the Council passed resolution against government's nationalisation plan, which was in turn rejected.

The second session of the Council started on 22 October 1911, days after outbreak of 1911 revolution. The Council recommended sacking of Sheng Xuanhuai as Minister of Mail for "violating rights, breaking laws, deceiving the Emperor", and calling him as the one "damaging the empire the most", which was agreed by the Emperor. Eight days later, the Council called for replacing the cabinet of Princes and to be completely responsible with non-royals as ministers of state, which was agreed by the court. On 3 November, Nineteen Articles were announced by the court after the Council voiced support for constitutional monarchy. The Charter of the Council was amended on 20 November. On 27 October, upon recommendation from the Council, the court finally repealed ban on Han hairstyle and costume and replaced lunar calendar with solar calendar.

One of the last acts of the Council was the election of Yuan Shih-kai as the Prime Minister. The Council was dissolved upon the end of the Qing dynasty.

Power 
According to the Charter of the Council amended on 3 July 1911 –Article 14

Advisory Council shall decide on matters of –

 Financial budgets on income and expenditure of the state;
 Final accounts on income and expenditure of the state;
 Taxation and public debt;
 Legislations and amendments thereof, except constitution; and
 Other issues upon directives by extraordinary edicts.

Article 15

Motions under subsection 1 to 4 of the aforesaid article shall be drafted and presented by cabinet ministers, and submit to the Council at meetings. Advisory Council, however, can draft and present motions at its initiative for matters under subsection 3 and subsection 4.

Article 16

Resolutions on matters particularised in Article 14 by the Advisory Council shall be presented by President or Vice President upon consultation with cabinet ministers for decisions by the Emperor.

Members 
Some members resigned during the session and the vacancies were filled according to the precedence list.

Supplementary members include:
 不入八分鎮國公載岐 (27 May 1911 appointed)
 三等承恩公瑞興 (27 May 1911 appointed)
 札薩克郡王鞥克濟爾噶勒 (27 May 1911 appointed)
 札薩克輔國公巴彥濟爾噶勒 (27 May 1911 appointed)
 黎湛枝 (22 July 1911 appointed)
 恩華 (22 July 1911 appointed)
 錢承鋕 (22 July 1911 appointed)
 范源濂 (22 July 1911 appointed)
 陳錦濤 (22 July 1911 appointed)
 奉國將軍溥善 (3 October 1911 appointed)
 一等侯德啟 (3 October 1911 appointed)
 彥惠 (3 October 1911 appointed)
 王季烈 (3 October 1911 appointed)
 程明超 (3 October 1911 appointed)

Gallery

See also
National Assembly (Republic of China)
National People's Congress

References

Sources 
 

Historical legislatures in China
Defunct unicameral legislatures
1910 establishments in China
1912 disestablishments in China